Marshall Ayub (born 5 December 1988) is a Bangladeshi cricketer who represents Dhaka Metropolis and the Chittagong Kings. An all-rounder, he bowls right-arm leg spin, and bats right-handed. He began his career representing Barisal Division in 2005–06 before moving on to play for Dhaka Division for the 2006–07 season and Dhaka Metropolis in 2011. Ayub has also represented the Bangladesh A side and played for Cyclones of Chittagong, Khulna Royal Bengals and Chittagong Kings in the now defunct Bangladesh National Cricket League and the Bangladesh Premier League respectively.

Ayub was born in Dhaka, Bangladesh. In December 2005, he made his debut for Barisal Division in a List A match against Khulna, and subsequently making his first-class debut against the same side. In January 2013, Ayub received modest media coverage as he and Mehrab Hossain, Jr. recorded the highest partnership in Bangladesh's first-class cricket and the second highest in all-time fifth-wicket stands, Ayub top scoring with 289 in a partnership worth 494 runs.

As a result of his consistent performance in first-class cricket, Marshall got a call in the test squad for Bangladesh during the tour of Sri Lanka in 2013. However, he could not make it to the first eleven during that tour where Bangladesh lost by 1 – 0 in a two match test series.

In October 2018, he was named in the squad for the Rajshahi Kings team, following the draft for the 2018–19 Bangladesh Premier League.

References

External links

1988 births
Living people
Bangladeshi cricketers
Bangladesh Test cricketers
Barisal Division cricketers
Dhaka Division cricketers
Khulna Tigers cricketers
Dhaka Metropolis cricketers
Chattogram Challengers cricketers
Victoria Sporting Club cricketers
Kala Bagan Cricket Academy cricketers
Sheikh Jamal Dhanmondi Club cricketers
Chittagong Division cricketers
Bangladesh Central Zone cricketers
Rajshahi Royals cricketers
Cricketers from Dhaka
Rupganj Tigers Cricket Club cricketers